Kwan Hi Lim (Hangul:임관희; July 11, 1922 – December 22, 2008) was a Korean-American character actor, best known for his role as Lt. Tanaka in the television series Magnum, P.I. The reboot of the same TV series was played by Sung Kang & no relation to Tim Kang.

Life and career
A native of Hawaii, he was one of the many locals who have been used in TV series and movies that took place on the islands. Lim appeared frequently on the TV series Hawaii Five-O, where he primarily portrayed villains. He was known to many as the recurring character Lt. Yoshi Tanaka of the Honolulu Police Department on Magnum, P.I..

Lim worked as an attorney since 1953, retiring in the 1990s. Lim had an office on the third floor of an old mixed-use office building on King Street in the Chinatown section of Honolulu. He once was asked why he always played the "bad guy" in the Hawaii Five-O series. He attributed it to "the way I squint my eyes, I just look evil". He got his first television role in his 40s when he was flirting with some tourists after coming from surfing and a casting director from Hawaii Five-O spotted him. Lim never had any formal training throughout his acting career. After Magnum, P.I., he acted sporadically and was a per diem judge for the Family Court system in Honolulu.

Filmography

References

External links

1922 births
American male television actors
American male actors of Korean descent
Male actors from Hawaii
2008 deaths
20th-century American male actors